Gene P. Lavanchy (born September 17, 1964) is an American radio and television personality and journalist, and a co-host of WFXT's Boston 25 Morning News in Boston.

Education and career 
Lavanchy was born in Boston, Massachusetts,  grew up in Walpole, Massachusetts, and received his Bachelor of Science degree in Mass Communication/Broadcast Journalism from Emerson College in 1986.

Gene began his broadcast career in 1983 at WJCC-AM radio (now WDIS AM 1170) in Norfolk, Massachusetts as a sports writer and producer.

He got his start in TV news in 1986, covering sports at WBBH-TV in Fort Myers, Florida, in 1988 he was a sports anchor at WLNE-TV in Providence, Rhode Island, and also host of WSBK-TV's Boston Bruins telecasts.

Coming onto the news scene in 1993 with WHDH in Boston, he became their sports director and sports anchor in 1994. As time progressed, he also hosted WHDH's "Sports Xtra" Sunday late night sports program, where he would interview and discuss current topics with many local New England sports stars. After leaving WHDH, Gene arrived to WFXT in August 2003. Lavanchy and co-host Kim Carrigan, who had also left WHDH, lead one of Boston's most popular morning news shows.

On December 17, 2007, Lavanchy featured his own English Wikipedia article page on WFXT's Morning News in a segment about finding yourself on the Internet.

Awards 
Lavanchy won the UPI award for overall sports coverage in 1988, was the recipient of the 1991 AP award for best sports feature, and, in 1994, Lavanchy was named "Best Sports Anchor" by Boston magazine's annual "Best of Boston" Awards.

Personal life 
He and his wife Anne Marie and their children live in Walpole, Massachusetts.

References
Fox 25 Newsteam Biography

Further reading 
 Craig, Jack, "Lavanchy Enjoys Ch.38's 'Family'", The Boston Globe, December 8, 1989
 Greenidge, Jim, "Sugg in, Shorr out at Ch. 7 : Lavanchy decides on a changing of the guard with producers", The Boston Globe, November 3, 1994

Emerson College alumni
American television reporters and correspondents
Sports in Boston
1964 births
Television anchors from Boston
Living people
Boston Bruins announcers
People from Walpole, Massachusetts
National Hockey League broadcasters
American television sports anchors